Global Hybrid Cooperation, formerly Advanced Hybrid System 2 (AHS2), is a set of hybrid vehicle technologies jointly developed by General Motors, Daimler, and Chrysler LLC, with BMW joining in 2005. It uses 2 or 3 planetary gearsets in an automatic transmission: one on the internal combustion engine (ICE) side (input split) paired with a second (output split), forming the compound split, and possibly one third additional planetary gearset to multiply the number of fixed gear ratios (up to 4). General Motors has stopped using the "AHS2" name as of 2006, preferring to call it simply a two-mode hybrid system.

This technology was named as "Technology of the Year" for 2007 by Automobile magazine.

While Toyota's Hybrid Synergy Drive may appear similar in that it also combines the power from an ICE and a pair of electric motor–generators; however in its current form, Toyota uses only one planetary gearset providing only single mode functionality (i.e. input split only) using a series/parallel architecture. While, Honda's Integrated Motor Assist uses a traditional ICE and transmission where the flywheel is replaced with an electric motor: it is a simple parallel architecture, requiring the addition of a mechanical continuously variable transmission (CVT), i.e. not electrically variable.

Cooperation
The GM/DaimlerChrysler partnership was announced on December 13, 2004 with Dieter Zetsche of DaimlerChrysler joining Rick Wagoner of GM on stage with a prototype. The agreement was not signed until the following August, however.

GM was reportedly responsible for development of rear- and four-wheel drive truck and front wheel drive car systems while DaimlerChrysler was focused on a rear wheel drive luxury car application.

It was announced on September 7, 2005 that BMW would also join the alliance, likely using then-archrival DaimlerChrysler's rear wheel drive system.

The three companies formed an organization called Global Hybrid Cooperation with engineering and management centered at the GM, DaimlerChrysler and BMW Hybrid Development Center in Troy, Michigan. Recent reports indicate that the three automakers will spend one billion US dollars between them on the development of the front- and rear-wheel drive hybrid transmissions.

On March 1, 2007, BMW and DaimlerChrysler announced that they were expanding their partnership and moving quickly to develop a mild hybrid module for rear wheel drive premium cars. They planned to roll out the new system within the next three years on BMW and Mercedes-Benz vehicles produced. In 2009 Mercedes released the S400 hybrid using a lithium ion battery.

GM is not part of this expanded partnership, and has not announced plans to develop a hybrid RWD system for cars.

It was reported in July 2009, however, that after the upcoming introductions of two-mode versions of the BMW X6 globally and the Mercedes-Benz M class only in the United States, the joint venture would be dissolved. Daimler indicated that it wants to avoid investing in aftersales and service for a vehicle which will only be produced in small quantities, and will instead concentrate on modular hybrid building blocks with scalable lithium-ion batteries, based on the hybrid drive developed for the S-class and 7 Series sedans in another joint venture with BMW and auto supplier Continental AG.

Technology

The technology is referred to as "two-mode" hybrid transmission due to the ability to extend the abilities of both electrical and mechanical paths of power. The two modes of operation are:

 Input-split mode — The rotational speed of the 2nd motor (M/G 2) is always proportional to the output shaft, while the 1st motor (M/G 1) is not proportional to the input shaft. The 2nd electric motor direct drive the output, and it is possible to drive the vehicle without combustion engine. The power flow is split only at the input, that is why it is called Input-split. At low speeds, the vehicle can move with either the electric motor/generators, the internal combustion engine, or both, making it a so-called full hybrid. All accessories will still remain functioning on electric power, and the engine can restart instantly if needed. In this mode, one of the motor/generators (M/G 1) acts as a generator, while the other operates as a motor (M/G 2). This mode is operational for the two continuously variable ranges (input split and compound split) of the transmission.
 Compound-split mode — The rotational speed of the 2nd motor (M/G 2) is not proportional to the output shaft, like the 1st motor (M/G 1) is not proportional to the input shaft. The power flow is split at the input and at the output, that is why it is called Compound-split. It is impossible to drive the vehicle without combustion engine.
This mode begins at the point where one of the motor/generators reaches zero speed; at this point some clutches within the system engage while others disengage to alter the physical configuration of the transmission, and the velocity is Vshift. Immediately after the shift, both electric machines operate as motors and the first gear ratio is employed. At a given velocity above Vshift, the second gear ratio is employed, and M/G 2 begins to operate as a generator, while also slowing down its angular speed.

Although the transmission mechanically has only four conventional gear ratios, the electric motors allow it to function as a continuously variable transmission. This variable ratio functions in addition to the torque multiplication of the planetary gears.

A special automatic transmission (designated as a 2ML70 by General Motors) incorporates two 82 kW (110 hp peak) three phase permanent magnet motors, three planetary gear sets, and four selectively engaging friction clutches. This system amplifies the output of the electric motors similarly to the way in which a conventional transmission amplifies the torque of an internal combustion engine. It also, when required, permits transfer of more of the engine's torque to the wheels, making the transmission more efficient even without the electric motors in use. Finally, the whole system fits into the space of, and indeed appears as, a conventional Allison model 1000 automatic transmission.

A 300 volt battery pack is housed elsewhere in the vehicle to store energy.

How it works
Operation of the Allison Transmission (AHS-2), or Two-Mode Hybrid, from the Global Hybrid Cooperation. This transmission is mounted on the BMW ActiveHybrid and the Mercedes-Benz ML450 BlueHybrid.

First Power Split Mode, also known as Input-Split:
(clutches C1 engaged, C2+C3+C4 released)
The first planetary gearset pair acts as a four-driveshaft power-split transmission, and the last planetary gearset reduces the rotational speed. The second motor-generator (MG-B) rotational speed is proportional to the output driveshaft.

Second Power Split Mode, aka Compound-Split:
(clutches C2 engaged, C1+C3+C4 released)
The first planetary gearset pair acts as a four-driveshaft power-split transmission. No motor-generator is directly coupled with input or output.

First Fixed Gear ratio:
(clutches C1+C4 engaged, C2+C3 released)
The first planetary gearset pair is maintained in a synchronous 1:1 fixed gear ratio by shunt C4 clutch action, and the last planetary gearset reduces the rotational speed.
Both motor-generators are mutually synchronous, either both as motors, or both as generators. It's the midpoint of the first continuously variable range, when both motor-generators rotational speed join.

Second Fixed Gear ratio:
(clutches C1+C2 engaged, C3+C4 released)
The last planetary gearset force the first pair into an intermediate fixed gear ratio.
The rotational speed of both motor-generators are very asymmetric (1:9), excluding effective usage of the first one (MG-A). It's the boundary between both continuously variable ranges. The two-modes switching occurs at this point, when the third planetary gearset ring gear reach zero rotational speed, and all the planetary gearset carriers gears reach the same rotational speed together.

Third Fixed Gear ratio:
(clutches C2+C4 engaged, C1+C3 released)
The first planetary gearset pair are in a synchronous 1:1 fixed gear ratio by C4 clutch action, and, by the way, both motor-generators are mutually synchronous, either all as motor, or all as generator. It's the midpoint of the second continuously variable range, when both motor-generators rotational speed join.

Fourth Fixed Gear ratio:
(clutches C2+C3 engaged, C1+C4 released)
The third C3 clutch block the first planetary gearset sun gear, and the second motor-generator (MG-B) still off-line.

Applications

Buses
The system was first used in the New Flyer transit buses deployed in 2001.
 City bus system by Allison Transmission
 King County, Washington King County Metro (361 New Flyer buses announced from 2002 to present) The first DE60LF, serial 24129
 Albuquerque, New Mexico ABQ RIDE (112 New Flyer buses announced from December 21, 2004 to present)
 Indianapolis, Indiana IndyGo (two buses announced January 24, 2005)
 Yosemite National Park National Park Service (18 Gillig buses announced April 25, 2005)
 Kelowna and Victoria, British Columbia (6 New Flyer buses announced May 5, 2005)
 Shreveport, Louisiana SporTran (one bus announced June 9, 2005)
 Charlotte, North Carolina Charlotte Area Transit System (2 buses announced June 9, 2005)
 Springfield, Massachusetts Pioneer Valley Transit Authority (one bus announced October 14, 2005)
 Aspen, Colorado Roaring Fork Transportation Authority (seven buses announced December 9, 2005)
 Consortium (led by San Joaquin RTD) of 10 transit agencies in California and Nevada (157 Gillig buses announced March 20, 2006).
 Note: ABQ RIDE of Albuquerque, New Mexico was formerly a member of this consortium, but instead chose to order New Flyer buses on their own instead.
 Madison, Wisconsin Madison Metro (5 Gillig buses announced September 11, 2007, with 10 more planned for purchase in the next few years)

RWD/4WD Truck/SUV
The longitudinal system for light trucks from General Motors will be manufactured at Baltimore Transmission by GM's PowerTrain division. The nickel-metal hydride batteries will be manufactured by Panasonic EV of Japan.

The system was introduced for the 2008 model year in the full-sized Chevrolet Tahoe and GMC Yukon SUVs as a specific 2-Mode Hybrid model.
 Rear wheel drive and four wheel drive light duty trucks using the 2-mode hybrid system include:
 GMC Graphyte Hybrid SUV concept (shown at the 2005 NAIAS)
 2008-2013 Chevrolet Tahoe Hybrid
 2008-2013 GMC Yukon Hybrid
 2009 Dodge Durango Hybrid
 2009 Chrysler Aspen Hybrid
 2009-2013 Cadillac Escalade Hybrid
 2009-2013 Chevrolet Silverado Hybrid(aka GMT900)
 2009-2013 GMC Sierra Hybrid(aka GMT900)
 2010-2011 BMW X6 ActiveHybrid
 2010-2011 Mercedes ML 450 hybrid

FWD
 Front wheel drive car system
 Opel Astra Diesel hybrid concept (shown at the 2005 NAIAS)
 Saab 9-3 BioPower Hybrid Concept (shown at the 2006 British International Motorshow)
 2010 Saturn Vue 2-Mode Plug-in Hybrid SUV, 45% improvement over Mild hybrid version according to GM (originally intended for the 2009 MY, it was delayed and ultimately cancelled due to the demise of Saturn as a GM division, never entered production)
 2011 undisclosed GM product (possibly a new Buick "crossover" utility or Cadillac AWD sedan)

Other GM Hybrids
 BAS Hybrid (GM mild hybrid)
 GM Voltec powertrain
 Hybrid car
 List of hybrid vehicles

Notes

References

External links
 Dual-Mode Hybrid Simulation | MATLAB 
 Comparative Assessment of Hybrid Vehicle Power Split Transmissions
 Electrically variable transmission having two planetary gear sets with one fixed interconnection, US Patent Application 2006/0111213 A1

Automotive transmission technologies
BMW
Mercedes-Benz Group
DaimlerChrysler
Hybrid powertrain
Hybrid vehicles
General Motors transmissions
General Motors hybrid technologies